Vai Que Cola is a Brazilian television series broadcast on Multishow.

Cast

Paulo Gustavo as Valdomiro Lacerda
 as Dona Jô 
 as Ferdinando
Samantha Schmutz as Jéssica
Fiorella Mattheis as Velna 
Cacau Protásio as Terezinha 
 as Maicól 
 as Wilson 
 as Lacraia
 as Brito/Apartment manager 
Werner Schünemann as Lent
Jonathan Haagensen as Pagodeiro 
Klebber Toledo as himself 
 as herself
Flávia Reis as Marli

Film adaptation
A feature film adaptation titled Vai Que Cola - O Filme was released on October 1, 2015.

References

External links
 

Brazilian television series